Oto, Ōtō, or OTO may refer to:

People
Oto (name), including a list of people with the name
The Otoe tribe (also spelled Oto), a Native American people

Places
Oto, Spain, a village in the Valle de Broto, in Huesca, Aragon

Japan
Ōtō, Fukuoka
Ōtō, Nara, merged into Gojō in 2005
Ōtō, Wakayama, merged into Tanabe in 2005

United States
Oto, Iowa
Oto, Missouri
Oto Reservation, formerly located in southeastern Nebraska
OTO Homestead and Dude Ranch, Montana

Other uses
Greta oto, a butterfly of family Nymphalidae
Ordo Templi Orientis, organization centered on the Law of Thelema 
Oto (album), the third album by Fluke, released in 1995
OTO Awards, a Slovak awards show
Otocinclus, a genus of armored catfish
Zebra oto
Oto-Manguean languages, a large family comprising several families of Native American languages
Oto-Pamean languages
Oto Melara, an Italian defense company, formerly known as Odero Terni Orlando
OTO (Slovenian TV channel), part of media company Pro Plus
Seibi Oto, a fictional character in the anime series Sky Girls
Osu! Tatakae! Ouendan!, a 2005 rhythm video game

See also
Aloadae, Greek mythological figures also known as Otos
Otoe (disambiguation)
Otology, a branch of medicine which studies the ear
Otos, Valencia, Spain